Richard Joshua Reynolds Jr. (April 4, 1906 – December 14, 1964) was an American entrepreneur and the son of R.J. Reynolds, founder of the R.J. Reynolds Tobacco Company.

Biography
Reynolds was an American businessman, politician, activist and philanthropist.

In 1934, he acquired Sapelo Island on the Atlantic coast of Georgia and, following the death of Tillinghast L'Hommedieu Huston in 1938, the Butler Island Plantation

Reynolds was appointed treasurer of the Democratic National Committee in early 1941 before being elected mayor of Winston-Salem, North Carolina, a few moths later. He took a leave of absence from his mayoral duties and resigned his treasurer post in 1942 when he began military service as a lieutenant at the Naval Combat Intelligence School in Quonset Point, Rhode Island.

As a businessman, he did not work at R. J. Reynolds Tobacco Company except as a young teenager. and was involved in creating Delta Air Lines. He was also a yachtsman (having the 125 ton ketch Aries built for him in 1952), pilot, aviator, and philanthropist.

Family life
Reynolds had four sons with his first wife, socialite Elizabeth McCaw Dillard: Richard Joshua Reynolds III (1933–1994), John Dillard Reynolds (1935–1990), Zachary Taylor Reynolds (1938–1979), and William Neal Reynolds (1940–2009). From his second marriage to the Hollywood stage and movie actress, Marianne O'Brien, his sons were: the activist Patrick Reynolds, and Michael Randolph Reynolds (1947–2004). His third marriage was to Muriel Marston Greenough, the younger sister of Anthony Heselton Marston, who was a major Canadian industrialist. His first three marriages ended in divorce. His fourth marriage, in 1961, was to Dr. Annemarie Schmitt, a psychiatrist.

Death
Reynolds was diagnosed with emphysema in 1960 and died four years later in Switzerland.

See also
Arca Foundation

References

External links 

Z. Smith Reynolds Airport
Winston-Salem Journal Series Death at Reynolda – Z. Smith Reynolds
The Z Smith Reynolds Foundation

Richard J. Reynolds High School
R. J. Reynolds Memorial Auditorium

1906 births
1964 deaths
20th-century American businesspeople
Reynolds family
Democratic National Committee treasurers
Mayors of Winston-Salem, North Carolina